Danila Yurevich Yurov (born 22 December 2003) is a Russian professional ice hockey player for Metallurg Magnitogorsk of the Kontinental Hockey League (KHL). He was drafted 24th overall by the Minnesota Wild in the 2022 NHL Entry Draft.

Playing career
Yurov made his professional debut for Metallurg Magnitogorsk during the 2020–21 season where he recorded one goal and one assist in 21 games.

International play
Yurov represented Russia at the 2021 IIHF World U18 Championships where he recorded four goals and seven assists in seven games and won a silver medal. He was slated to represent Russia at the 2022 World Junior Ice Hockey Championships until Russia was suspended from all IIHF events as a result of the invasion of Ukraine.

Career statistics

Regular season and playoffs

International

References

External links

2003 births
Living people
Metallurg Magnitogorsk players
Minnesota Wild draft picks
National Hockey League first-round draft picks
Russian ice hockey right wingers
Sportspeople from Chelyabinsk